Neal Asbury (born May 2, 1957) is Chief Executive of The Legacy Companies. An advocate of entrepreneurship and free enterprise,  he hosts the nationally syndicated talk radio show Neal Asbury's Truth for America (now Neal Asbury's Made in America).

Early life
Neal Asbury attended Jefferson Township High School in Jefferson Township, New Jersey. After graduation he enrolled in Rowan University in New Jersey graduating in 1979 with a Bachelor of Arts degree in Music.

Career 
After graduating from Rowan University Neal began working in the mail room of a Fifth Avenue as a food service exporter. A year later, Asbury moved on to Manila, working as a director of sales for a large trading company and traveling to capitals in the Far East. Seven years later, he founded Asbury Worldwide. By 1987, the firm had grown to include twelve distribution facilities around the globe.  In 1989, he started began FAB Asia, Inc. in Manila, Philippines, an  Asian fabricator of commercial kitchens for McDonald's as well as other American restaurant chains.

After selling his group of companies in July 1999, Asbury established Greenfield World Trade, a global trading company selling and servicing American manufactured products in over 130 countries to both  retail and commercial markets. He acquired J. Cobo (a distribution company with operations throughout Latin America), General (a manufacturer of food preparation equipment), Zeroll (a manufacturer of kitchen gadgets), and Omega (a manufacturer of electrical kitchen appliances).

Awards and distinctions
Asbury has received the E-Star Export Award and the Export Achievement Award from the U.S. Department of Commerce. Asbury's company was recognized as National Champion Exporter of The Year(2008) after they were first recognized in February as Exporter of the Year for Florida, which was preceded by being selected as the Region IV Exporter of the Year, covering the Southeast United States.  Greenfield World Trade's Neal Asbury Named SBA's National Champion Exporter of the Year.

Radio show and blog
Each week Asbury hosts a talk radio show, Neal Asbury's Made In America, (formerly Truth For America), produced by Atlantic Radio Network.  It is broadcast around the US by Radio America and deals with topics related to America's entrepreneurial spirit and the American Dream.

Asbury also writes the Conscientious Equity blog, which focuses on his interest for small business, entrepreneurship and the benefits of expanding the U.S. role in global commerce. Topics discussed on the blog range from the health care crisis to job creation and international trade. Asbury's blog entries have been syndicated online, appearing on Moneynews.com.

Personal life
On December 29 in 1984 Neal married Elizabeth Trixia Gomez Carpio, an actress from the Philippines. They have two daughters.

References

1957 births
Living people
Businesspeople from Columbus, Ohio
People from Jefferson Township, New Jersey